Lee Johnston (born November 17, 1992) is an American soccer player who plays as a goalkeeper.

Career
Lee Johnston played part of his youth soccer career for JBS FC under the guidance of Head Coach Jonathan Langer.  He helped lead JBS FC to multiple tournament titles to include the Disney Soccer Showcase, Disney Presidents Day Cup, and the APC Cup.  When Lee moved to Newberry, FL, he joined Leg-A-Z Soccer Academy in Gainesville, FL. Lee played Varsity soccer as a goalkeeper and also played baseball as a center fielder at Oak Hall High School in Gainesville. He played under Coach Basil Benjamin at Leg-A-Z and Oak Hall. At the time Johnston was regarded as one of the most sought after goalkeepers in the country.

College
Johnston played four years of college soccer, two years at both the University of Pittsburgh and two years at West Virginia University.

Professional career
Johnston signed with San Antonio FC on March 18, 2016.

Personal
Johnston is the grandson of former professional baseball player Joe Hicks.

References

1992 births
Living people
American soccer players
Pittsburgh Panthers men's soccer players
West Virginia Mountaineers men's soccer players
San Antonio FC players
USL Championship players
Soccer players from Florida
Association football goalkeepers
People from Alachua County, Florida
Sportspeople from Gainesville, Florida